Aion a.k.a. Ambakich is a Keram language of Papua New Guinea. It is only spoken by adults; children grow up speaking Tok Pisin.

References

Keram languages
Languages of East Sepik Province
Endangered Papuan languages